University of San Augustine was a college located in Texas on June 5, 1837.  It was located in  San Augustine, Texas.  It was granted its charter in 1837.  Attendance rose to 150 students but dropped to 50.   As a result of a rivalry between itself and Wesleyan College, both school closed down.  In 1847 effort was made to merge both school and form the University of Eastern Texas.  These efforts failed and all failed in 1851.

Notable people
Elisha Roberts (Trustee)

References 

Educational institutions established in 1837
Educational institutions disestablished in 1847
Defunct private universities and colleges in Texas